Trapper Peak is a mountain in Alberta and British Columbia, Canada, located on their border along the Continental Divide in the Wapta Icefield.

Trapper Peak has two summits, one accessible from Baker.

The peak was originally named in 1892 by Walter D. Wilcox to honor his guide, trapper Bill Peyto, and the first ascent was in 1933 by Conrad Kain and party.

Geology

Trapper Peak is composed of sedimentary rock laid down during the Precambrian to Jurassic periods. Formed in shallow seas, this sedimentary rock was pushed east and over the top of younger rock during the Laramide orogeny.

Climate

Based on the Köppen climate classification, Trapper Peak is located in a subarctic climate zone with cold, snowy winters, and mild summers.

See also
 List of peaks on the Alberta–British Columbia border

References

Two-thousanders of Alberta
Two-thousanders of British Columbia
Borders of Alberta
Borders of British Columbia
Canadian Rockies
Great Divide of North America